Steve Swell (born in Newark, New Jersey, December 6, 1954) is an American free jazz trombonist, composer, and educator.

Music career
Swell studied at Jersey City State Teachers College before moving to New York City in 1975 where he began his musical life, playing in top 40 bands, salsa bands, big bands (most notably those of Buddy Rich and Lionel Hampton) and performed on Broadway in Bob Fosse's Dancin' . He then became a member of Makanda Ken McIntyre's band which led to tours and recordings with Tim Berne, Joey Baron, Herb Robertson, Jemeel Moondoc, Anthony Braxton, Cecil Taylor, William Parker, Bill Dixon, Butch Morris, John Zorn, Dave Burrell, Elliott Sharp, Rob Mazurek, Perry Robinson, Ken Vandermark.

He is greatly influenced by Roswell Rudd, with whom he studied in the mid-1970s. He was also a student of Grachan Moncur III and Jimmy Knepper.

Swell has led a number of projects, including Slammin' the Infinite (w/Sabir Mateen, Matthew Heyner, Klaus Kugel), Fire Into Music (with William Parker, Jemeel Moondoc, Hamid Drake), Unified Theory of Sound (with Cooper-Moore, Matt Lavelle) and his large ensemble Nation of We (aka NOW Ensemble).

Swell has received a number of awards including a USArts International (NEA) travel grant in 2006, grants from MCAF (LMCC) in 2008 & 2012, Foundation for Contemporary Arts and was nominated for Trombonist of Year, 2008, 2011 & 2020 by the Jazz Journalists Association. He was chosen Trombonist of the Year 2008-2010, 2012 & 2014-2021 by El Intruso, the Argentine jazz journal. In 2008 he received a fellowship award from The Jubilation Foundation of the Tides Foundation for his work in the New York City public school system and was selected by the Down Beat Critics Poll in the Trombone category 2010-2022. He also received the 2014 Creative Curricula grant from the Lower Manhattan Cultural Council. Steve earned a Bachelor of Arts degree in Music from SUNY in 2016.

Discography

As leader or co-leader
 Observations (CIMP, 1996) - Steve Swell & Chris Kelsey Duo
 Out and About (CIMP, 1996) - Steve Swell Quartet featuring Roswell Rudd w/Ken Filiano, Lou Grassi
 Moons of Jupiter (CIMP, 1997) - Steve Swell Quartet w/Mark Whitecage, Dominic Duval, Jay Rosen
 Atmospheels (CIMP, 1999) - Steve Swell Trio w/Will Connell, Lou Grassi
 Flurries Warm and Clear (CIMP, 1999) - Steve Swell Trio w/Ned Rothenberg, Tomas Ulrich
 Steve Swell presents Particle Data Group (Cadence, 2001)
 The Implicate Order at Seixal (Clean Feed, 2001) - Steve Swell, Ken Filiano, Lou Grassi + Rodrigo Amado, Paulo Curado
 Poets of the Now (CIMP, 2002)
 Unified Theory Of Sound: This Now! - (Cadence Jazz, 2003) - Steve Swell, Jemeel Moondoc, Cooper-Moore, Wilber Morris, Kevin Norton, Matt LaVelle
 New York BrassWood Trio: Still in Movement (CIMP, 2003)
 Suite for Players, Listeners and Other Dreamers (CIMP, 2003) - Steve Swell, Roy Campbell, Charles Burnham, Will Connell, Kevin Norton, Francois Grillot
 Invisible Cities (Drimala, 2004) - Steve Swell/Perry Robinson Duo
 Not Just... (CIMP, 2005) - Steve Swell/Dave Taylor Quintet Billy Bang, Tomas Ulrich, Ken Filiano
 Double Dipoid (CIMP, 2006) - Steve Swell/Dave Taylor Quartet w/Warren Smith, Chad Taylor
 Swimming in a Galaxy of Goodwill and Sorrow (RogueArt, 2007)- Steve Swell's Fire Into Music w/Jemeel Moondoc, William Parker, Hamid Drake
 Rivers of Sound Ensemble: News from the Mystic Auricle (Not Two, 2008) - Steve Swell, Roy Campbell, Sabir Mateen, Hilliard "Hill" Greene, Klaus Kugel
 Magical Listening Hour (Cadence Jazz, 2009) - Steve Swell/Nate Wooley/Michael Attias/Louie Belogenis
 Planet Dream (Clean Feed, 2009) - Steve Swell, Rob Brown, Daniel Levin
 Feynman's Diagrams (Nacht, 2013)- Steve Swell/Kirk Knuffke Duo
 Kanreki (Not Two, 2015)
 Kende Dreams (Silkheart, 2015)
 Soul Travelers (RogueArt, 2016)
 Music for Six Musicians: Hommage À Olivier Messiaen (Silkheart, 2017)

with Slammin' the Infinite
 Slammin' the Infinite (Cadence Jazz, 2004)- Steve Swell, Sabir Mateen, Matt Heyner, Klaus Kugel
 Remember Now (NotTwo, 2006) - Steve Swell, Sabir Mateen, Matt Heyner, Klaus Kugel
 Live @ the Vision Festival (NotTwo, 2007) - Steve Swell, Sabir Mateen, Matt Heyner, Klaus Kugel, John Blum
 5000 Poems (NotTwo, 2010) - Steve Swell, Sabir Mateen, Matt Heyner, Klaus Kugel, John Blum

with Ullmann/Swell 4
 Desert Songs and Other Landscapes (CIMP, 2004) - Barry Altschul, Hill Greene
 News? No News! (Jazzwerskstatt, 2010)- Barry Altschul, Hill Greene
 Live in Montreal (CIMP, 2010)- Barry Altschul, Hill Greene

with Nation of We
 Live at the Bowery Poetry Club (Ayler, 2006)
 The Business of Here (Cadence Jazz, 2012)

with Inner Ear
 Breathing Steam (Kilogram, 2010) Mikolaj Trzaska, Steve Swell, Per Ake Holmlander, Tim Daisy
 Return from the Center of the Earth (Bocian, 2013) - Mikolaj Trzaska, Steve Swell, Per Ake Holmlander, Tim Daisy

With Marshall Allen
 PoZest (CIMP, 2000)

Collaborations
 The Trascendentalists: Real Time Messengers (CIMP, 2003) - Steve Swell, Daniel Carter, Tom Abbs, Dave Brandt
 The Diplomats: We Are Not Obstinate Islands (Clean Feed, 2006) - Rob Brown, Harris Eisenstadt
 International Trio: Donkere Golven (W.E.R.F., 2011) - Joachim Badenhorst, Steve Swell, Ziv Ravitz
 Platform 1: Takes Off (Clean Feed, 2012) - Ken Vandermark, Magnus Broo, Steve Swell, Joe Williamson, Michael Vatcher
 Dragonfly Breath (NotTwo, 2013) - Paul Flaherty/Weasel Walter/C Spenser Yeh/Steve Swell
 Latecomers (Ictus, 2013) - Andrea Centazzo/Giancarlo Schiaffini/Steve Swell/Anthony Coleman
 Estuaries (dEN, 2013) - Andrew Raffo Dewar/Garrison Fewell/Steve Swell
 Window and Doorway (Driff, 2013) - Pandelis Karayorgis/Guillermo Gregorio/Steve Swell
 New Atlantis Octet: Unto the Sun (NotTwo, 2013) - Ed Ricart, Roy Campbell, Steve Swell, Aaron Martin, Jason Ajemian, Vattel Cherry, Andrew Barker, Sam Lohman
 Turning Point (NoBusiness, 2014) - Dave Burrell / Steve Swell

Digital Release
 Schemata and Heuristics for Four Clarinets #1 (Relay, 2014) - Ned Rothenberg/Guillermo Gregorio/Zara Acosta-Chen/Miguel Malla - https://web.archive.org/web/20140508042901/http://timdaisyrelayrecords.bandcamp.com/track/schemata-and-heuristics-for-clarinets-1-by-steve-swell-relay-new-composers-004
 Steve Swell's Nation Of We (Ayler, 2006) - Saxes: Rob Brown, Will Connell, Saco Yasuma, Sabir Mateen, Ras Moshe 
Trumpets: Roy Campbell, Lewis Barnes, Matt LaVelle 
Trombones: Dick Griffin, Peter Zummo, Steve Swell, Dave Taylor 
Piano: Chris Forbes 
Bass: Matthew Heyner, Todd Nicholson 
Drums: Jackson Krall-
https://ayler-records.bandcamp.com/album/live-at-the-bowery-poetry-club

As sideman
With Joey Baron
 Tongue in Groove (JMT, 1992)
 Crackshot (Avant, 1995)
With Tim Berne
 Pace Yourself (JMT, 1991)
 Nice View (JMT, 1994)
With Anthony Braxton
 Trillium R Opera (Braxton House, 1997)
With Rob Brown
 Radiant Pools (RogueArt, 2005)
With Jaki Byard and the Apollo Stompers
 Phantasies (Soul Note, 1984)
With Bill Dixon
 17 Musicians in Search of a Sound: Darfur (AUM Fidelity, 2007)
With Jemeel Moondoc
 Spirit House (Eremite, 2001)
 Live at the Vision Festival (Ayler, 2003)
 The Zookeeper's House (Relative Pitch, 2014)
With William Parker
 Flowers Grow in My Room (Centering, 1994)
 Sunrise in the Tone World (AUM Fidelity, 1995)
 Mayor of Punkville (AUM Fidelity, 1999)
 Raincoat in the River (Eremite, 2001)
 Spontaneous (Splasc(H), 2002)
 For Percy Heath (Victo, 2005)
 Essence of Ellington (Centering, 2012)
With Roswell Rudd
 Broad Strokes (Knitting Factory, 2000)
With Alan Silva
 Alan Silva & the Sound Visions Orchestra (Eremite, 2001)
 H.Con.Res.57/Treasure Box (Eremite, 2003)
With Cecil Taylor
 All the Notes (DVD) Cecil Taylor and Orchestra Humane - Chris Felver Films (2005)
With Ken Vandermark
 Resonance Ensemble: Head Above Water
 Resonance Ensemble: What Country Is This?
 Resonance Ensemble: Kafka in Flight
 Resonance Ensemble: Live in Krakow
 Resonance Ensemble: Live in the Ukraine
With Tom Varner
 The Mystery of Compassion (Soul Note, 1992)

References

External links 
 Official website
 Steve Swell @ All About Jazz

Avant-garde jazz musicians
American jazz trombonists
Male trombonists
Musicians from Newark, New Jersey
1954 births
Living people
21st-century trombonists
21st-century American male musicians
American male jazz musicians
RogueArt artists
NoBusiness Records artists